Yazıcı or Yaziji is a Turkish surname, meaning 'clerk'.

Yazici may refer to:

Surname
 Ali Nihat Yazıcı, Turkish chess official
 Fatma Yazıcı, Turkish billionaire businesswoman
 Hayati Yazıcı, Turkish lawyer and politician
 Serap Yazıcı, Turkish academic
 Tahsin Yazıcı, Turkish army officer
 Yusuf Yazıcı, Turkish footballer
 Yusuf Yazici (doctor), Turkish scientist

Others
 Yazıcı Dam, dam in Turkey

See also
 Yaziji / Yazigi

Turkish-language surnames